Co-operative Insurance Society Ltd v Argyll Stores (Holdings) Ltd [1997] UKHL 17 is an English contract law case, concerning the possibility of claiming specific performance of a promise after breach of contract.

Facts
The Co-operative Insurance Society Ltd owned the freehold of a shopping centre and they let the anchor unit to Argyll as a supermarket, for 35 years, starting 1979, with a covenant to ‘keep open the demised premises for retail trade’. In 1995, the store was making a loss and Argyll closed, despite The Co-operative Insurance's protests.

The trial judge refused a specific performance order. The Court of Appeal granted an award of specific performance by a majority, because there was considerable difficulty proving a loss suffered and Argyll had acted with ‘unmitigated commercial cynicism’. Argyll appealed.

Judgment
The House of Lords allowed Argyll’s appeal and said the judge’s exercise of discretion was correct so that no specific performance could be awarded. Setting out reasons, (1) it was settled practice that no order would make someone run a business (2) enormous losses would result from being forced to run a trade (3) framing the order would be hard (4) wasteful litigation over compliance could result (5) it was oppressive to have to run a business under threat of contempt of court (6) it was against the public interest to require a business to be run if compensation was a plausible alternative. Lord Hoffmann said the following.

This case could be contrasted with Warner Brothers v. Nelson [Bette Davis] (1936 KB), where the court agreed to enforce a negative personal obligation, an obligation not to work in the film industry but with Warner Bros.

See also

English contract law
Sky Petroleum v VIP Petroleum [1974] 1 WLR 576
Restatement (Second) of Contracts 1979 §364

Notes

References

English contract case law
1997 in case law
1997 in British law
House of Lords cases